Auchinairn (Scottish Gaelic: Achadh an Fheàrna) is a suburb (formerly a village) within East Dunbartonshire, Scotland, and shares its southern boundary with the Robroyston and Balornock districts within the City of Glasgow.

History
Etymology
The original village of Auchinairn is derived from Scottish Gaelic

 Achadh an Fheàrna (silent "fh") - field of the alders.
 Achadh an Eòrna - field of barley.
 Achadh an Iarainn - field of iron (it is believed that iron ore was once mined there).

The village

Auchinairn village originally developed as two distinct areas: Old Auchinairn (The Auld Toon) and New Auchinairn. Old Auchinairn lay to the north side of Auchinairn Road, between what is now Woodhill Road and Letham Drive. It had a school which was built about 1760.
     
New Auchinairn lay approximately between what is now Montrose Terrace and Springfield Avenue. It had a primary school which opened in 1876 and is now the Auchinairn Community Centre. The current primary school building stands on what was Auchinairn United football field.

The village was founded by weavers and has housed workers from many different industries around the area, such as the mines, the railway and the quarry.

In 1836 Auchinairn Village’s population stood at 284 compared with neighbouring Bishopbriggs population which stood at 175, but the opening of the Edinburgh and Glasgow Railway in 1842 brought new industries to the area and as a result of this, housing was required for the workers. For many years Auchinairn was a vibrant community with a co-operative, a post office, several small shops, a public house, a community hall and a mission hall. The Free Church mission which met in that hall was granted full church status in 1865. The members built a church on Springfield Road, Bishopbriggs. It is now part of Springfield Cambridge Church.
   
Auchinairn had a brass band and a football team. Quoits was another popular activity. Littlehill Golf Course was designed by James Braid and opened in 1923. Harry Varden played there in 1925. Club professional, Tom Wilson, was once overnight leader in the British Open. 
 

Although viewed today as part of the town of Bishopbriggs, Auchinairn still has a strong sense of community and its own identity. There were five villages: Auchinairn; Bishopbriggs; Cadder; Jellyhill; and Mavis Valley. All were separated from one another by farmland. In 1938 residents were moved from Auchinairn to council housing in Bishopbriggs. Post Second World War housing development resulted the farmland being built on. In 1964 the district was granted burgh status, and the name ‘Bishopbriggs’ was adopted.

Present day
Auchinairn has several shops, public houses and restaurants, a primary school and a bowling club. A wide range of activities is offered in the community centre and in the community hall.

Noted residents

The Agnew family lived in a house on the main street in Auchinairn. Agnew's started as  grocers in Hawthorn Street near Ashfield football ground. Mr Agnew was Polish (Krasnodębski) and used his wife’s maiden name. Their son Ricky Agnew started building up the successful off-licence chain 'Agnews Off Licence' when he was only 19. By the time he sold it to Seagrams in 1986, he had 75 shops in Scotland, 18 in England, and a turnover of £30m.

Famous residents include:
Average White Band member Onnie McIntyre (born Owen McIntyre, 25 September 1945, Lennoxtown, Scotland - Family moved to Crowhill Road, Auchinairn/Bishopbriggs where he attended Auchinairn Primary) — vocals / rhythm guitar.
Mimic and voice over artist Lewis MacLeod attended Auchinairn Primary School in the 1970s.
John Lindsay who played football for Glasgow Rangers and Everton in the 1940s and 1950s.
Joe Kerr who became Scottish lightweight boxing champion on 22 September 1943.

References

This article incorporates text from a publication not in the public domain but reproduced with permission from the author: Findlay, Bill (2009). Auchinairn

Suburbs in East Dunbartonshire
Bishopbriggs